Kari Laukkanen (born 14 December 1963) is a retired football goalkeeper.

During his club career, Laukkanen notably played for KuPS, Stuttgarter Kickers and Waldhof Mannheim. He also made 49 Appearances for the Finland national team. He is the current coach of NJS Nurmijärvi, playing in Kolmonen as well as goalkeeping coach for Finland's U21 team.

References

External links
 

1963 births
Living people
People from Pielavesi
Finnish footballers
Finnish expatriate footballers
Finland international footballers
Association football goalkeepers
Kuopion Palloseura players
Cercle Brugge K.S.V. players
Stuttgarter Kickers players
FinnPa players
Hangö IK players
SV Waldhof Mannheim players
Bundesliga players
2. Bundesliga players
Sportspeople from North Savo